Martina Navratilova and Pam Shriver were the defending champions and won in the final 6–3, 6–2 against Rosemary Casals and Wendy Turnbull.

Seeds
Champion seeds are indicated in bold text while text in italics indicates the round in which those seeds were eliminated.

 Martina Navratilova /  Pam Shriver (champions)
 Kathy Jordan /  Anne Smith (semifinals)
 Claudia Kohde-Kilsch /  Eva Pfaff (quarterfinals)
 Rosemary Casals /  Wendy Turnbull (final)

Draw

External links
 1983 Virginia Slims of Dallas Doubles Draw

Virginia Slims of Dallas
1983 Virginia Slims World Championship Series